Luis Mercedes Escobar Sánchez (September 24, 1953 – February 4, 2005), nicknamed "Escoba" (broom), was a relief pitcher in Major League Baseball who played for the California Angels. He also played in Japan for the Yomiuri Giants. He batted and threw right-handed.

Career
A native of Cariaco, Venezuela, Sánchez was signed by the Houston Astros as an amateur free agent in 1971. After playing through 1976 in the minor league systems of Houston and Cincinnati, Sánchez appeared in the Mexican League.

Sánchez was the Angels' closer from 1983 to 1984. After the emergence of Donnie Moore in 1985, he divided his time in the bullpen as a middle reliever or set-up man. In 1986 and 1987, he pitched for the Yomiuri Giants.

In a five-year major league career, Sánchez posted a 28–21 record with 216 strikeouts, 27 saves and a 3.75 ERA in 369 innings.

Sánchez died in Vargas State, Venezuela at age 51.

See also
 List of Major League Baseball players from Venezuela

External links

Retrosheet info page
Venezuelan Professional Baseball League statistics

1953 births
2005 deaths
Albuquerque Dukes players
California Angels players
Caribes de Oriente players
Cedar Rapids Astros players
Cocoa Astros players
Columbus Astros players
Dubuque Packers players
Edmonton Trappers players
Llaneros de Portuguesa players
Major League Baseball pitchers
Major League Baseball players from Venezuela
Mexican League baseball pitchers
Nippon Professional Baseball pitchers
People from Sucre (state)
Rojos del Águila de Veracruz players
Salt Lake City Gulls players
Spokane Indians players
Tampa Tarpons (1957–1987) players
Tiburones de La Guaira players
American expatriate baseball players in Venezuela
Venezuelan expatriate baseball players in Canada
Venezuelan expatriate baseball players in Japan
Venezuelan expatriate baseball players in Mexico
Venezuelan expatriate baseball players in the United States
Yomiuri Giants players